Sangwangsimni Station is a station on Seoul Subway Line 2 in Seongdong-gu, Seoul, South Korea.

Station layout

Accident

On May 2, 2014 KST, two subway cars collided at Sangwangsimni Station, causing 238 injuries.

References

Seoul Metropolitan Subway stations
Railway stations opened in 1983
Metro stations in Seongdong District
1983 establishments in South Korea
20th-century architecture in South Korea